Jatt Brothers is a 2022 Indian Punjabi-language film. It stars Guri, Jass Manak and Nikeet Dhillon. The film is directed by Manav Shah and produced by Kv Dhillon. Initially scheduled to be released on 9 July 2021, the release has been postponed due to the COVID-19 pandemic in India. Later the film was scheduled to be released on 4 February 2022 but now it is releasing on 25 February 2022.

Cast 
 Guri as Jaggi
 Jass Manak as Pamma
 Nikeet Dhillon as Jyot
 Anita Devgan 
 Swaalina as Tina
 Jayy Randhawa as Lover

Release 
The film was scheduled to be released on 9 July 2021 but postponed due to the COVID-19 pandemic in India. Now the film is releasing theatrically on 25 February 2022.

Production 
The film was shot in January 2020 and was announced later in the year.

References

External links 

 

2022 films
Punjabi-language Indian films